Dasht-e Mehran (also Romanized as Dasht-e Mehrān) is a village in Rudbar Rural District, in the Central District of Rudbar-e Jonubi County, Kerman Province, Iran. At the 2006 census, its population was 999, in 196 families.

References 

Populated places in Rudbar-e Jonubi County